The 2015 Kirkland Tennis Challenger was a professional tennis tournament played on outdoor hard courts. It was the first edition of the tournament and part of the 2015 ITF Women's Circuit, offering a total of $50,000 in prize money. It took place in Kirkland, Washington, United States, on 5–11 October 2015.

Singles main draw entrants

Seeds 

 1 Rankings as of 28 September 2015

Other entrants 
The following players received wildcards into the singles main draw:
  Jacqueline Cako
  Gail Brodsky
  Ellie Halbauer
  Ashley Weinhold

The following players received entry from the qualifying draw:
  Sabastiani León
  Despina Papamichail
  Sabrina Santamaria
  Piia Suomalainen

The following player received entry by a lucky loser spot:
  Heidi El Tabakh

Champions

Singles

 Mandy Minella def.  Nicole Gibbs, 2–6, 7–5, 6–2

Doubles

 Stéphanie Foretz /  Mandy Minella def.  Lesley Kerkhove /  Arantxa Rus, 6–4, 4–6, [10–4]

External links 
 2015 Kirkland Tennis Challenger at ITFtennis.com
 

2015 ITF Women's Circuit
2015
Kirkland